The upcoming 2023 season will be the Buffalo Bills' 64th season in the National Football League, their ninth full season under the ownership of Terry and Kim Pegula, and their seventh under the head coach/general manager tandem of Sean McDermott and Brandon Beane. They will attempt to improve upon their franchise best 13–3 record from last season, win the AFC East for the 4th consecutive season, make the playoffs for the 5th consecutive season, make the Super Bowl for the first time since 1993, and win the Super Bowl for the first time.

Transactions

Arrivals

Departures

Draft

Draft trades

Staff

Current roster

Preseason
The Bills' preseason opponents and schedule will be announced in the spring.

Regular season

2023 opponents
Listed below are the Bills' opponents for 2023. Exact dates and times will be announced in the spring. The Bills will also host one of their games at Tottenham Hotspur Stadium in London as part of the NFL International Series.

References

External links
 

Buffalo
Buffalo Bills seasons
Buffalo Bills